The legislative districts of Surigao del Sur are the representations of the province of Surigao del Sur in the various national legislatures of the Philippines. The province is currently represented in the lower house of the Congress of the Philippines through its first and second congressional districts.

History 

Prior to gaining separate representation, areas now under the jurisdiction of Surigao del Sur were represented under the former province of Surigao (1907–1961).

The enactment of Republic Act No. 2786 on June 19, 1960 split the old Surigao province into Surigao del Norte and Surigao del Sur, and provided the new provinces separate representations in Congress. The new province of Surigao del Sur first elected its own representative in the 1961 elections.

Surigao del Sur was represented in the Interim Batasang Pambansa as part of Region XI from 1978 to 1984, and returned one representative, elected at large, to the Regular Batasang Pambansa in 1984. The province was reapportioned into two congressional districts under the new Constitution which was proclaimed on February 11, 1987, and elected members to the restored House of Representatives starting that same year.

1st District 
City: Tandag (became city 2007)
Municipalities: Bayabas, Cagwait, Cantilan, Carmen, Carrascal, Cortes, Lanuza, Lianga, Madrid, Marihatag, San Agustin, San Miguel, Tago
Population (2020): 369,785

Notes

2nd District 

City: Bislig (became city 2000)
Municipalities: Barobo, Hinatuan, Lingig, Tagbina
Population (2020): 272,470

Lone District (defunct)

At-Large (defunct)

See also 
Legislative district of Surigao

References 

Surigao del Sur
Politics of Surigao del Sur